Louise Cole (born 11 July 1974) is an Irish sailor. She competed in the women's 470 event at the 1996 Summer Olympics.

References

External links
 

1974 births
Living people
Irish female sailors (sport)
Olympic sailors of Ireland
Sailors at the 1996 Summer Olympics – 470
Place of birth missing (living people)